The canton of Plabennec is an administrative division of the Finistère department, northwestern France. Its borders were modified at the French canton reorganisation which came into effect in March 2015. Its seat is in Plabennec.

It consists of the following communes:
 
Bourg-Blanc
Coat-Méal
Kersaint-Plabennec
Lampaul-Ploudalmézeau
Landéda
Landunvez
Lannilis
Plabennec
Ploudalmézeau
Plouguin
Plouvien
Saint-Pabu
Tréglonou

References

Cantons of Finistère